Moshrageh or Masharageh or Meshrageh or Mosharageh may refer to:
 Masharageh, Hendijan
 Moshrageh, Ramshir
 Moshrageh District, in Ramshir County
 Moshrageh Rural District, in Ramshir County